Trilobopsis loricata is a species of air-breathing land snail, a terrestrial pulmonate gastropod mollusk in the family Polygyridae.

Subspecies 
Trilobopsis loricata lowei (Pilsbry, 1925)
Trilobopsis loricata mariposa Pilsbry, 1940
Trilobopsis loricata nortensis (Berry, 1933)
Trilobopsis loricata perforata Pilsbry, 1940
Trilobopsis loricata sonomaensis (Hemphill, 1911)

References

Polygyridae